Yeşiltömek is a village in the Sultanhanı District, Aksaray Province, Turkey. Its population is 672 (2021).

References

Sultanhanı District
Villages in Aksaray Province